The Main road 578 is a short bypass direction Secondary class main road near Pécs, that connects the Main road 6 to the M60 motorway's Pécs-kelet junction.

The road, as well as all other main roads in Hungary, is managed and maintained by Magyar Közút, state owned company.

See also

 Roads in Hungary

Sources

External links
 Hungarian Public Road Non-Profit Ltd. (Magyar Közút Nonprofit Zrt.)
 National Infrastructure Developer Ltd.

Main roads in Hungary
Baranya County